The 1933–34 1re série season was the 18th season of the 1re série, the top level of ice hockey in France. The Rapides de Paris won their first and only championship.

Tournament

Semifinals
 Rapides de Paris - Français Volants 2:0 (0:0, 1:0, 1:0)
 Chamonix Hockey Club - Diables de France 1:0 (0:0, 0:0, 1:0)

3rd place game
 Français Volants - Diables de France 2:1 (1:0, 1:1)

Final
 Rapides de Paris - Chamonix Hockey Club 7:0 (4:0, 1:0, 2:0)

External links
Season on hockeyarchives.info

Fra
1933 in French sport
1933–34 in French ice hockey
Ligue Magnus seasons